Caraphia lingafelteri is a species of beetle in the family Cerambycidae. It was described by Ohbayashi and Yamasako in 2016. It is found in Matagalpa Department in Nicaragua.

References

Lepturinae
Beetles described in 2016